STAR is an American interbank network. It is the largest interbank network in United States, with 2 million ATMs, 134 million cardholders and over 5,700 participating financial institutions. The STAR Network began in 1984 and was acquired by First Data Corporation in 2003. The network is owned and operated by STAR Networks, a subsidiary company of First Data.

Mergers

The network has existed since the 1980s, and has since included several other networks, mostly in the 2000s:

 Alert
 BankMate
 Cactus
 Cash Station
 Explore
 HONOR
 Money Access Center (MAC)
 MOST
 VIA

See also
ATM usage fees

References

External links
 STAR Networks

Financial services companies established in 1984
Banking terms
Companies based in San Diego
Financial services companies of the United States
Interbank networks